Mon frère is a 2019 French drama film directed and co-written by Julien Abraham, starring French rapper MHD. The plot revolves around Teddy (MHD) a young man who is accused of the murder of his violent father, when trying to protect his little brother from him. Teddy is then sent to a youth detention center, waiting for his trial for patricide.

Cast
 Mohamed "MHD" Sylla as Teddy
 Darren Muselet as Enzo
 Aïssa Maïga as Claude
 Jalil Lespert as Igor
 Youssouf Gueye as Andy
 Hiam Abbass as Mme Miroun
 Lisette Malidor as the grandmother
 Mark Grosy as the father
 Neva Kehouane as the mother
 Almamy Kanoute as Papou
 Fatima Ait Bounoua as the French teacher
 Mathieu Longatte as Olivier (credited as Matthieu Longuatte)
 Najeto Injai as Mo
 Hakou Benosmane as Unsal
 Didier Michon as Moïse

Production
Mon frère marks the film debut of French rapper Mohamed Sylla, also known as MHD, who rose to success in the mid-2010s through songs he published online. During production, MHD was arrested by French police and charged with second-degree murder in January 2019 following investigation into the death of a man in the streets of Paris. MHD, who claimed his innocence, was still remanded in custody at the time of the film's release.

Release
Mon frère was released in French theaters on July 31, 2019.

References

External links
 
 

2019 films
2010s French-language films
French drama films
Hood films
French-language Netflix original films
2010s American films
2010s French films